was a Japanese engineer. He was the former managing director of Fujitsu and was the pioneer of domestic computer production in Japan.

External links
 
 

20th-century Japanese engineers
1923 births
1974 deaths
Recipients of the Medal with Purple Ribbon